Didi No. 1 is a Bengali television game show for women launched in 2010. The show airs on Zee Bangla six days a week and also available on ZEE5 digitally.
It is the second longest-running Bengali television series by episode count.

Background of the program
There are total four rounds in Didi No. 1. Participants can get many gifts answering the questions asked by the anchor. At the end of each episode, the anchor gives crests and free gifts to the participants for their participation. The winner gets a different type of crest than the other participants. She also gets a badge tied upon her saree by the anchor.
Season 9 was launched in a completely new avatar. First round contestants will play against each other in two pairs where host will ask questions and who will be able to answer that will collect all necessary grocery items within 10 seconds. In 2nd round the name change to Gaane Gaane Lokkhi Labh where contestant if answers right then will get the chance to collect a pouch which contains money.

Seasons 
 Season 1: Anchor: Pushpita Mukherjee
 Season 2: Anchor: Rachna Banerjee
 Season 3: Anchor: June Malia
 Season 4: Anchor: Rachna Banerjee
 Season 5: Anchor: Debashree Roy
 Season 6: Anchor: Rachna Banerjee
 Season 7: Anchor: Rachna Banerjee
Season 8: Anchor:  Rachna Banerjee  / Sudipa Chatterjee and Sourav Das (for one week)
 Season 9: Anchor: Rachna Banerjee

See also 

 Rojgere Ginni, Bengali television show

References

External links 
 Didi No. 1 at ZEE5

Bengali-language television programming in India
Indian reality television series
Indian game shows
Zee Bangla original programming